Shelpek is a traditional Central Asian flatbread commonly consumed all over the region. The main ingredients of shelpek are flour, milk, sugar, butter, sour cream such as Kaymak, baking soda, salt and vegetable oil.

The dough is shaped into balls and fried in hot vegetable oil until reaching a golden color. Shelpek can also be prepared with yeast, thus the dough stays soft for a longer period of time. The recipe to prepare the dough in the given case is similar to the one used for baursak.

See also

 Qistibi very similar turnover
 Chiburekki very similar turnover
 Haliva
 Börek
 Fried dough
 Gözleme
 Khuushuur
 Lángos
 Lörtsy
 Pastel (food)
 Puri (food)
 Qutab
 Samosa

References 

Kazakhstani cuisine
Kyrgyz cuisine
Turkmenistan cuisine
Uzbekistani cuisine
Flatbreads
Deep fried foods